Mesophleps adustipennis, the soybean webworm moth, is a moth of the family Gelechiidae. It is found in the western and southern parts of the United States (California, Texas, Mississippi and Florida), Mexico, Honduras, Costa Rica, Panama, Cuba, the West Indies (the Cayman Islands, Jamaica, Puerto Rico, Guana, St Thomas, St Croix, Anguilla, Dominica, Barbados, Grenada, Tobago, Trinidad), Venezuela, Ecuador (Galapagos Islands), Peru, Brazil (Rondônia, Amazonas, Maranhão, Minas Gerais, Espírito Santo, São Paulo).

The wingspan is 7.5–18 mm. The forewings are greyish white to yellowish brown, the distal three-fifths of the costa lined with a dark brown stripe, interrupted by an oblique pale line running from the distal fifth towards the termen.

The larvae feed on Cajanus cajan, Crotalaria, Acacia farnesiana and Pithecellobium pallens. They live in the pods and feed on the seeds. Pupation takes place in a silken cocoon within the pods. On the Galapagos Islands the species has been reared from the fruits of Prosopis juliflora and from Leucaena leucocephala.

References

Moths described in 1897
Mesophleps